Antonio Casal Rivadulla  (10 June 1910 – 11 February 1974) was a Spanish film actor who appeared in over 50 films between 1941 and his death in 1974.

Selected filmography

External links 
 

Spanish male film actors
1910 births
1974 deaths
20th-century Spanish male actors